The 1780 Java earthquake was a significant event in the history of Indonesia. The magnitude of the earthquake is estimated to be at least 8.5. while other sources usually refer to it with a range of Mw 8.0 to 8.5.

Tectonic Setting 
The Java subduction zone has not had any large-magnitude earthquakes in the past 100 to 200 years except for an M8.0–8.5 Java Trench earthquake in 1780, which was the largest historical earthquake in the Java Trench. Recent large earthquakes in other subduction zones have cast doubt on the notion that long-term fault behavior can be inferred by as little as one century of historical earthquake records. The total convergence rate across the Java Trench is about 6 to 7 cm a year, higher than most other major subduction zones in the region.

Earthquake 
The earthquake occurred in the Sunda Strait  segment of the Java Trench. the magnitude of the earthquake was set as Mw 8.5. although some experts estimate it as Mw 8.0-8.5.

Damage 
The earthquake toppled buildings in Bogor, Banten and Batavia. intensity VIII damage was set in the Batavia. 27 warehouses collapsed in the city due to the shaking, No information about the casualties due to limited historical records. An observatory in the city 24 meters high which was built in 1765 was badly damaged and abandoned after the earthquake. The earthquake may have triggered an increase in volcanic activity at Mount Salak and Pangrango.

Future Hazard 
The Sunda Strait segment has the potential to trigger a large earthquake with a magnitude of 8.7 or higher. The recent Banten earthquake has signaled the potential of a megathrust earthquake in southern Java, Sunda Strait, Sumatra, and its megathrusts. If the Sunda Strait, Enggano, and West-Central Java megathrust segments rupture at the same time, their magnitude can reach 9.0 or higher on the Richter scale. The Sunda Strait segment has a high risk of tsunami probability, and seismic activity in the Megathrust Subduction Zone of this segment can cause a major tsunami.

See Also 
• List of earthquakes in Indonesia 

• Java Trench

Reference 

1780s earthquakes